Veena Sahasrabuddhe (14 September 1948 – 29 June 2016) was an Indian vocalist and composer of Hindustani classical music from Kanpur. Her singing style had its roots in Gwalior gharana, but it also borrowed from Jaipur and Kirana gharanas. Sahasrabuddhe was known as a singer of khyal and bhajan.

Musical career 
Veena Sahasrabuddhe was born in a musical family. Her father Shankar Shripad Bodas was a disciple of vocalist Vishnu Digambar Paluskar. She began her early musical education under her father, and then under her brother Kashinath Shankar Bodas. She also learned Kathak dancing in her childhood. Sahasrabuddhe's musical mentors included Balwantrai Bhatt, Vasant Thakar, and Gajananrao Joshi. Later she also trained briefly under Gaansaraswati Kishori Amonkar.

She had a bachelor's degree in vocal performance, Sanskrit literature, and English literature from Kanpur University (1968), a master's degree (Sangeet Alankar) in vocal performance from A.B.G.M.V. Mandal (1969), and also master's degree in Sanskrit from Kanpur University (1979). A.B.G.M.V. Mandal conferred on her a doctorate in vocal music (Sangeet Praveen) in 1988. For some years she was the head of the department of music at SNDT Pune campus. She performed all over India and in several countries around the world.

Early life 
Her father Shankar Shripad Bodas was a contemporary of Omkarnath Thakur and Vinayakrao Patwardhan, and one of the earliest students of Vishnu Digambar Paluskar who founded the famous Gandharva Mahavidyalaya. Bodas was specially invited by Paluskar to move to Kanpur from Mumbai and spread music. Bodas and Shanta migrated to Kanpur in 1926, founded a Sangit Samaj and began teaching students, inviting other performers and propagating music. The Paluskar tradition was essentially in the Gwalior Gharana style and temperament of singing. Kanpur was an industrial town without any notable cultural life, particularly classical music. Until then, Uttar Pradesh had other places such as Banaras and Allahabad where music thrived. Veena's mother Shanta was also a singer and taught music in local schools in Kanpur. Veena grew up in this musical atmosphere at home. In addition to training from her father, she also trained with her brother Kashinath.

Death 
Veena Sahasrabuddhe gave her last concert on 2 December 2012. She was diagnosed with progressive supranuclear palsy. She died on 29 June 2016.

Awards 
 A prize in Vocal Classical category in a national competition for artists under age 25, conducted by All India Radio (1972)
 Uttar Pradesh Sangeet Natak Akademi Award (1993)
Sangeet Natak Akademi Award (2013)
Akhil Bharatiya Gandharva Mahavidyalaya Mandal (ABGMV) confers posthumously the Honorary Degree " संगीत महामहोपाध्याय " (2019)

References

External links 
 Hindu.com

1948 births
2016 deaths
Hindustani singers
Indian women classical singers
Gwalior gharana
Chhatrapati Shahu Ji Maharaj University alumni
Hindustani composers
Indian women composers
20th-century Indian singers
People from Kanpur
Women Hindustani musicians
Indian women classical musicians
20th-century Indian composers
20th-century Indian women singers
21st-century Indian women singers
21st-century Indian singers
Women musicians from Uttar Pradesh
20th-century women composers
20th-century Khyal singers
Recipients of the Sangeet Natak Akademi Award